For the surname, see Carlyon (surname)

Carlyon (meaning fort of rock-slabs) is one of four new civil parishes created on 1 April 2009 for the St Austell area of south Cornwall, England, United Kingdom.

The new parish is part coastal and part rural in character. It includes the settlements of Carlyon Bay, Garker and Tregrehan Mills and is represented by nine councillors.

Carlyon Bay, the principal settlement in the parish, is approximately two miles (3 km) east of St Austell.

References

Civil parishes in Cornwall
Beaches of Cornwall
Populated coastal places in Cornwall